This article is about the Rolling stock of the Epping Ongar Railway.

Steam locomotives 
Reference

Diesel locomotives 
Reference

DMUs

DEMUs

EMUs 
Epping Ongar Railway has an affinity with electric multiple unit (EMU) preservation, as the branch used LT's electric stock from 1957 until 1994. There was talk of the line being electrified by the LNER with overhead electrification before the Second World War intervened. Some local lines were electrified quite early on, for example to Shenfield and Southend, and the next generations of EMUs continue to work services on those lines into Liverpool Street.

While the 3rd & 4th conductor rails were removed by the new owners, the line still hosts electric style units, though without the electrification they are hauled by a diesel locomotive. Due to cost, safety issues and legislation it is not possible to re-electrify the branch.

Carriages

Gresley Carriages 
The most iconic carriage design of the LNER, these lasted well into BR ownership. Finalised in 1923, the design utilised a 60 ft underframe, with more traditional squared moulding and windows and wooden teak-panelled bodies. There are two examples on the EOR a Buffet car and Brake Tourist Open (BTO) examples..

British Railways standard steam stock (Mk.I) 
The Backbone of most preserved railways, They are a durable design, representing in many ways the culmination of traditional carriage design in the UK, prior to the introduction of monocoque techniques.

British Railways (Mk.II)

Goods wagons

Brake vans

Covered goods vans

Flat wagons, bolster wagons and Rail and Sleeper wagons

Ballast wagons

Cranes and other special use wagons

References

Epping Ongar Railway
Swanage Railway